Acetophenazine (Tindal) is a typical antipsychotic of the phenothiazine class.

See also 
 Typical antipsychotic
 Phenothiazine

References 

Primary alcohols
Aromatic ketones
Phenothiazines
Piperazines
Typical antipsychotics